El Pentágono: The Return is a Don Omar album released on June 3, 2008. It is the special edition to El Pentágono.

Track listings

Don Omar compilation albums
2008 compilation albums